Ore is a small village in Farsund municipality in Agder county, Norway. The village sits on the northeast side of the Farsund Airport, Lista. Ore School, an elementary school serving this part of Farsund was located in the village.

References

Farsund
Villages in Agder